Hungard Creek is a stream in the U.S. state of West Virginia.

Hungard Creek was named for an early settler named Hungard or Hungart.

See also
List of rivers of West Virginia

References

Rivers of Summers County, West Virginia
Rivers of West Virginia